Roughwood is a historic estate at 400 Heath Street in Brookline, Massachusetts.  It is currently the main campus of Pine Manor College.  The main estate house and outbuildings were designed by Andrews, Jaques and Rantoul, and built in 1891 as the summer estate of William Cox, a wholesale dealer in the footwear industry.  The estate house is one of the largest Shingle-style houses in Brookline.  The property was reduced in size by sales of land to the adjacent country club, and for the establishment of Dane Park; the estate was acquired by Pine Manor College in 1961, which has retained the estate's rural flavor.

It was added to the National Register of Historic Places in 1985.

See also
National Register of Historic Places listings in Brookline, Massachusetts

References

Houses in Brookline, Massachusetts
Shingle Style houses
National Register of Historic Places in Brookline, Massachusetts
Houses on the National Register of Historic Places in Norfolk County, Massachusetts
Houses completed in 1891
1891 establishments in Massachusetts
Shingle Style architecture in Massachusetts